SS Jasper F. Cropsey was a Liberty ship built in the United States during World War II. She was named after Jasper F. Cropsey, an American landscape artist of the Hudson River School.

Construction
Jasper F. Cropsey was laid down on 19 May 1944, under a Maritime Commission (MARCOM) contract, MC hull 2484, by the St. Johns River Shipbuilding Company, Jacksonville, Florida; sponsored by Mrs. William Thinschneider, the granddaughter of the namesake, and was launched on 30 June 1944.

History
She was allocated to the United States Navigation Co., Inc., on 20 July 1944. She was sold for commercial use, 7 April 1947, to United States Navigation Co., Inc. After a name and several owner changes she was scrapped in Italy, in 1967.

References

Bibliography

 
 
 
 

 

Liberty ships
Ships built in Jacksonville, Florida
1944 ships